The Leninets or L class were the second class of submarines to be built for the Soviet Navy. Twenty-five were built in four groups between 1931 and 1941. They were minelaying submarines and were based on the British L-class submarine, which was sunk during the British intervention in the Russian Civil War. Some experience from the previous s was also utilised. The boats were of the saddle tank type and mines were carried in two stern galleries as pioneered on the pre-war Russian submarine Krab (1912), the world's first minelaying submarine. These boats were considered successful by the Soviets. Groups 3 and 4 had more powerful engines and a higher top speed.

Ships

Group 1

Six ships were built (L1 to L6), all launched in 1931. Three were assigned to the Baltic Fleet and three to the Black Sea Fleet, including Soviet submarine L-3.

Group 2

Six ships were built (L7 to L 12) and launched between 1935 and 1936. All were built for the Pacific Fleet by plant 202 "Dalzavod" Vladivostok and plant 199 Komsomolsk-na-Amure.

Group 3

Seven ships were built (L13 to L19)  and launched from 1937 to 1938. All were assigned to the Pacific Fleet. Considered a new project, the hull was based on the Srednyaya class. They carried 18 mines.

Group 4

6 ships were built (L20 to L25) and launched from 1940 to 1941. 3 were assigned to the Baltic Fleet and 3 to the Black Sea Fleet. This group added stern torpedo tubes and new, more powerful diesel engines.

References

Sources

 Chesneau, Roger, ed. (1980). Conway's All the World's Fighting Ships 1922–1946. Greenwich, UK: Conway Maritime Press. .
 Yakubov, Vladimir and Worth, Richard. (2008) Raising the Red Banner: The Pictorial History of Stalin's Fleet 1920-1945. Spellmount.

External links
 L-class submarines